Dummycrats is a 2018 political documentary featuring Diamond and Silk. It was produced by Kyle Olson of the American Mirror Media Company. The film opened nationwide on October 15, 2018, at 800 theaters for one night only. It was postponed from a September 2018 opening. The documentary premieres almost two years to the day after Michael Moore's Trumpland was released in a similar fashion in a limited release premiere 2016.

Cast
Diamond and Silk

See also
Death of a Nation (2018)

References

External links

2018 films
American documentary films
2010s English-language films
2010s American films